In military terminology, a missile is a guided airborne ranged weapon capable of self-propelled flight usually by a jet engine or rocket motor.It is used for precise targeting .  Missiles are thus also called guided missiles or guided rockets (when a previously unguided rocket is made guided). Missiles have five system components: targeting, guidance system, flight system, engine and warhead.  Missiles come in types adapted for different purposes: surface-to-surface and air-to-surface missiles (ballistic, cruise, anti-ship, anti-submarine, anti-tank, etc.), surface-to-air missiles (and anti-ballistic), air-to-air missiles, and anti-satellite weapons.

Airborne explosive devices without propulsion are referred to as shells if fired by an artillery piece and bombs if dropped by an aircraft. Unguided jet- or rocket-propelled weapons are usually described as rocket artillery.

Historically, the word missile referred to any projectile that is thrown, shot or propelled towards a target; this usage is still recognized today – this is one sense of the Latin missile where the English word come from.

Early development

The first missiles to be used operationally were a series of missiles developed by Nazi Germany in World War II. Most famous of these are the V-1 flying bomb and V-2 rocket, both of which used a mechanical autopilot to keep the missile flying along a pre-chosen route. Less well known were a series of Anti-Ship and Anti-aircraft missiles, typically based on a simple radio control (command guidance) system directed by the operator. However, these early systems in World War II were only built in small numbers.

Technology

Guided missiles have a number of different system components:
 Guidance system
 Targeting system
 Flight system
 Engine
 Warhead

Guidance, targeting and flight systems

The most common method of guidance is to use some form of radiation, such as infrared, lasers, or radio waves, to guide the missile onto its target. This radiation may emanate from the target (such as the heat of an engine or the radio waves from an enemy radar), it may be provided by the missile itself (such as radar), or it may be provided by a friendly third party (such as the radar of the launch vehicle/platform, or a laser designator operated by friendly infantry). The first two are often known as fire-and-forget as they need no further support or control from the launch vehicle/platform in order to function. Another method is to use TV guidance, with visible light or infrared pictures produced in order to see the target. The pictures may be used either by a human operator who steers the missile onto its target or by a computer doing much the same job. One of the more bizarre guidance methods instead used a pigeon to steer a missile to its target. Some missiles also have a home-on-jam capability to guide itself to a radar-emitting source. Many missiles use a combination of two or more methods to improve accuracy and the chances of successful engagement.

Another method is to target the missile by knowing the location of the target and using a guidance system such as INS, TERCOM, or satellite guidance. This guidance system guides the missile by knowing the missile's current position and the position of the target and then calculating a course between them. This job can also be performed somewhat crudely by a human operator who can see the target and the missile and guide it using either cable- or radio-based remote control, or by an automatic system that can simultaneously track the target and the missile.
Furthermore, some missiles use initial targeting, sending them to a target area, where they will switch to primary targeting, using either radar or IR targeting to acquire the target.

Whether a guided missile uses a targeting system, a guidance system or both, it needs a flight system. The flight system uses the data from the targeting or guidance system to maneuver the missile in flight, allowing it to counter inaccuracies in the missile or to follow a moving target. There are two main systems: vectored thrust (for missiles that are powered throughout the guidance phase of their flight) and aerodynamic maneuvering (wings, fins, canard (aeronautics), etc.).

Engine

Missiles are powered by an engine, generally either a type of rocket engine or jet engine. Rockets are generally of the solid-propellant type for ease of maintenance and fast deployment, although some larger ballistic missiles use liquid-propellant rockets. Jet engines are generally used in cruise missiles, most commonly of the turbojet type, due to its relative simplicity and low frontal area. Turbofans and ramjets are the only other common forms of jet engine propulsion, although any type of engine could theoretically be used. Long-range missiles may have multiple engine stages, particularly in those launched from the surface. These stages may all be of similar types or may include a mix of engine types − for example, surface-launched cruise missiles often have a rocket booster for launching and a jet engine for sustained flight.

Some missiles may have additional propulsion from another source at launch; for example, the V1 was launched by a catapult, and the MGM-51 Shillelagh was fired out of a tank gun (using a smaller charge than would be used for a shell).

Warhead
Missiles generally have one or more explosive warheads, although other weapon types may also be used. The warheads of a missile provide its primary destructive power (many missiles have extensive secondary destructive power due to the high kinetic energy of the weapon and unburnt fuel that may be on board). Warheads are most commonly of the high explosive type, often employing shaped charges to exploit the accuracy of a guided weapon to destroy hardened targets. Other warhead types include submunitions, incendiaries, nuclear weapons, chemical, biological or radiological weapons or kinetic energy penetrators. Warheadless missiles are often used for testing and training purposes.

Basic roles

Missiles are generally categorized by their launch platform and intended target. In broadest terms, these will either be surface (ground or water) or air, and then sub-categorized by range and the exact target type (such as anti-tank or anti-ship). Many weapons are designed to be launched from both surface or the air, and a few are designed to attack either surface or air targets (such as the ADATS missile). Most weapons require some modification in order to be launched from the air or surface, such as adding boosters to the surface-launched version.

Ballistic

After the boost stage, ballistic missiles follow a trajectory mainly determined by ballistics. The guidance is for relatively small deviations from that.

Ballistic missiles are largely used for land attack missions. Although normally associated with nuclear weapons, some conventionally armed ballistic missiles are in service, such as MGM-140 ATACMS. The V2 had demonstrated that a ballistic missile could deliver a warhead to a target city with no possibility of interception, and the introduction of nuclear weapons meant it could efficiently do damage when it arrived. The accuracy of these systems was fairly poor, but post-war development by most military forces improved the basic Inertial navigation system concept to the point where it could be used as the guidance system on Intercontinental ballistic missiles flying thousands of kilometers. Today, the ballistic missile represents the only strategic deterrent in most military forces; however, some ballistic missiles are being adapted for conventional roles, such as the Russian Iskander or the Chinese DF-21D anti-ship ballistic missile. Ballistic missiles are primarily surface-launched from mobile launchers, silos, ships or submarines, with air launch being theoretically possible with a weapon such as the cancelled Skybolt missile.

The Russian Topol M (SS-27 Sickle B) is the fastest (7,320 m/s) missile currently in service.

Cruise

The V1 had been successfully intercepted during World War II, but this did not make the cruise missile concept entirely useless. After the war, the US deployed a small number of nuclear-armed cruise missiles in Germany, but these were considered to be of limited usefulness. Continued research into much longer-ranged and faster versions led to the US's SM-64 Navaho and its Soviet counterparts, the Burya and Buran cruise missile. However, these were rendered largely obsolete by the ICBM, and none were used operationally. Shorter-range developments have become widely used as highly accurate attack systems, such as the US Tomahawk missile and Russian Kh-55. Cruise missiles are generally further divided into subsonic or supersonic weapons - supersonic weapons such as BrahMos (India, Russia) are difficult to shoot down, whereas subsonic weapons tend to be much lighter and cheaper, allowing more to be fired.

Cruise missiles are generally associated with land-attack operations, but also have an important role as anti-shipping weapons. They are primarily launched from air, sea or submarine platforms in both roles, although land-based launchers also exist.

Anti-ship and Anti-submarine

Another major German missile development project was the anti-shipping class (such as the Fritz X and Henschel Hs 293), intended to stop any attempt at a cross-channel invasion. However, the British were able to render their systems useless by jamming their radios, and missiles with wire guidance were not ready by D-Day. After the war, the anti-shipping class slowly developed and became a major class in the 1960s with the introduction of the low-flying jet- or rocket-powered cruise missiles known as "sea-skimmers". These became famous during the Falklands War, when an Argentine Exocet missile disabled a Royal Navy destroyer.

A number of anti-submarine missiles also exist; these generally use the missile in order to deliver another weapon system such as a torpedo or depth charge to the location of the submarine, at which point the other weapon will conduct the underwater phase of the mission.

Anti-tank

By the end of WWII, all forces had widely introduced unguided rockets using high-explosive anti-tank warheads as their major anti-tank weapon (see Panzerfaust, Bazooka). However, these had a limited useful range of 100 m or so, and the Germans were looking to extend this with the use of a missile using wire guidance, the X-7. After the war, this became a major design class in the later 1950s and, by the 1960s, had developed into practically the only non-tank anti-tank system in general use. During the 1973 Yom Kippur War between Israel and Egypt, the 9M14 Malyutka (aka Sagger) man-portable anti-tank missile proved potent against Israeli tanks. While other guidance systems have been tried, the basic reliability of wire guidance means this will remain the primary means to control anti-tank missiles in the near future. Anti-tank missiles may be launched from aircraft, vehicles or by ground troops in the case of smaller weapons.

Surface-to-air and subsurface-to-air

Anti-aircraft

By 1944, US and British air forces were sending huge air fleets over occupied Europe, increasing the pressure on the Luftwaffe day and night fighter forces. The Germans were keen to get some sort of useful ground-based anti-aircraft system into operation. Several systems were under development, but none had reached operational status before the war's end. The US Navy also started missile research to deal with the Kamikaze threat. By 1950, systems based on this early research started to reach operational service, including the US Army's MIM-3 Nike Ajax and the Navy's "3T's" (Talos, Terrier, Tartar), soon followed by the Soviet S-25 Berkut and S-75 Dvina and French and British systems. Anti-aircraft weapons exist for virtually every possible launch platform, with surface-launched systems ranging from huge, self-propelled or ship-mounted launchers to man-portable systems. Subsurface-to-air missiles are usually launched from below water (usually from submarines).

Anti-ballistic

Like most missiles, the S-300, S-400, Advanced Air Defence and MIM-104 Patriot are for defense against short-range missiles and carry explosive warheads.

In the case of a large closing speed, a projectile without explosives is used; just a collision is sufficient to destroy the target. See Missile Defense Agency for the following systems being developed:

 Arrow 3
 Kinetic Energy Interceptor (KEI)
 Aegis Ballistic Missile Defense System (Aegis BMD) - an SM-3 missile with a Lightweight Exo-Atmospheric Projectile (LEAP) Kinetic Warhead (KW)

Air-to-air

Le Prieur rockets (French Fusées Le Prieur) were a type of incendiary air-to-air rocket used in World War I against observation balloons and airships. The solid-fuel stick-guided rocket was first deployed during the Battle of Verdun in April 1916, later, in the summer of 1939 during the Battle of Khalkhin Gol. On August 20, 1939, the Japanese Nakajima Ki-27 fighter was attacked by the Soviet Polikarpov I-16 fighter of Captain N. Zvonarev. He fired a rocket salvo from a distance of about a kilometer, after which the Ki-27 crashed to the ground. A group of Polikarpov I-16 fighters under command of Captain N. Zvonarev were using RS-82 rockets against Japanese aircraft, shooting down 16 fighters and 3 bombers in total.

German experience in World War II demonstrated that destroying a large aircraft was quite difficult, and they had invested considerable effort into air-to-air missile systems to do this. Their Messerschmitt Me 262's jets often carried R4M rockets, and other types of "bomber destroyer" aircraft had unguided rockets as well. In the post-war period, the R4M served as the pattern for a number of similar systems, used by almost all interceptor aircraft during the 1940s and 1950s. Most rockets (except for the AIR-2 Genie, due to its nuclear warhead with a large blast radius) had to be carefully aimed at relatively close range to hit the target successfully. The United States Navy and U.S. Air Force began deploying guided missiles in the early 1950s, most famous being the US Navy's AIM-9 Sidewinder and the USAF's AIM-4 Falcon. These systems have continued to advance, and modern air warfare consists almost entirely of missile firing. In the Falklands War, less powerful British Harriers were able to defeat faster Argentinian opponents using American AIM-9L missiles. The latest heat-seeking designs can lock onto a target from various angles, not just from behind, where the heat signature from the engines is strongest. Other types rely on radar guidance (either on board or "painted" by the launching aircraft). Air-to-air missiles also have a wide range of sizes, ranging from helicopter-launched self-defense weapons with a range of a few kilometers, to long-range weapons designed for interceptor aircraft such as the R-37 (missile).

Anti-satellite

In the 1950s and 1960s, Soviet designers started work on an anti-satellite weapon as part of the Istrebitel Sputnikov program ("istrebitel sputnikov" literally means "destroyer of satellites"). After a lengthy development process of roughly twenty years, it was finally decided that the testing of these weapons be canceled. This was when the United States started testing their own systems. The Brilliant Pebbles defense system proposed during the 1980s would have used kinetic energy collisions without explosives. Anti-satellite weapons may be launched either by an aircraft or a surface platform, depending on the design. To date, only a few known tests have occurred. As of 2019, only 4 countries - China, India, United States, and Russia have operational anti-satellite weapons.

See also
 Anti-aircraft warfare
 Anti-ballistic missile defense countermeasure
 Aeroprediction
 Center of pressure
 Command missile
 Guided-missile destroyer
 List of ships sunk by missiles
 Loitering munition
 Missile approach warning system
 Missile boat
 Missile defense
 Missile defense systems by country
 Missile designation
 Missile gap
 Missile launch control center
 Missile launcher
 Missile range instrumentation ship
 Missile tank
 Missile Technology Control Regime
 Missile turret
 Missile vehicle
 NATO missile defence system
 Proportional navigation
 Rocket garden
 Scramjet
 Skid-to-turn
 Soft launching
 Timeline of rocket and missile technology
 Trajectory optimization
 Twilight phenomenon
 Vertical launching system

References

External links

Missile Threat: A Project of the Center for Strategic and International Studies

 
 
 
Ammunition
Explosive weapons